Vladimir Nikolayev may refer to:

Vladimir Nikolayev (architect) (1847–1911), Russian Empire architect, City Architect of Kiev
Vladimir Nikolayev (politician) (born 1973), Russian politician, city mayor of Vladivostok (2004–2007)
Vladimir Nikolayev (murderer) (born 1959), Russian murderer